Spring Fork is a tributary of Flat Creek in the U.S. state of Missouri, in Benton and Pettis Counties.

Spring Fork was so named because it is fed by a spring in its headwaters.

See also
List of rivers of Missouri

References

Rivers of Benton County, Missouri
Rivers of Pettis County, Missouri
Rivers of Missouri